The 2001 Major League Soccer SuperDraft was held on February 5, 2001, at the Signature Grand in Davie, Florida.

Player selection
Any player whose name is marked with an * was contracted under the Project-40 program.

Round 1

Round 1 trades

Round 2

Round 2 trades

Round 3

Round 3 trades

Round 4

Round 4 trades

Round 5

Round 5 trades

Round 6

Round 6 trades

Unresolved 2001 SuperDraft Trades
18 February 1999: Chicago Fire traded Zak Ibsen to Los Angeles Galaxy for 2001 second-round pick 
24 February 1999, Colorado acquired GK Ian Feuer from New England Revolution in exchange for future considerations . It is unclear whether this trade was fulfilled through a 2001 first-round pick (#6), a 2001 second-round pick (#18), or why New England gave up draft picks to unload a player. 
2 August 1999, Tampa Bay Mutiny traded defender Sam George, midfielder Paul Dougherty, and a conditional draft choice to Chicago Fire in exchange for defender Richie Kotschau and midfielder Manny Lagos. The draft pick may be 2001 pick #20.

References 

Major League Soccer drafts
SuperDraft
MLS SuperDraft
Soccer in Florida
Davie, Florida
Events in Florida
MLS SuperDraft